Tafsir Noor al-Thaqalayn is an exegesis on the Quran written by Abdul Ali Aroussi Howayzi, shia jurist and hadith narrator in the late 11th or early 12th century Hijri/17th Century AD. This commentary on the Quran is considered as narrative since it contains more than 30,000 hadiths (narrations). According to Howayzi himself, these are interpretive narrations related to the verses of Quran. However, it is believed that the author did not perform ijtihad based on the narrations, and only gathered them as a primary source.

Author's incentives
The author, Huwayzi explains that he wrote this tafsir because he believes all other available commentaries target only some aspects of Quran such as grammar, kalam, lexicography etc. He thought it important to add traditions of the Imams which are indispensable "for an understanding of the bright lights of the revelation and for revealing the mysteries of some of the ta'wil".

References

Shia tafsir